The Afoa language may refer to:
Kafoa language or Jafoo, a Papuan language of Alor Island in the Alor archipelago of Indonesia
Tauade language, a Papuan language of New Guinea